The Minister for Technology was a minister in the New South Wales Government that was responsible for assessing the impact of technological change on employment opportunities and the general structure of industry, and monitor and advise the role of science and technology on government policies.

Technology returned to the portfolio level in December 2021 as part of the responsibilities of the Minister for Science, Innovation and Technology, Alister Henskens.

List of ministers
The following individuals have served as Minister where Technology was one of the responsibilities in the portfolio:

See also 

List of New South Wales government agencies

References

Technology